"I've Never Done Anything Like This" is the third single from Bowling for Soup's eleventh studio album Fishin' for Woos. The song features guest vocals from Kay Hanley of Letters to Cleo. The three-song single was released digitally on October 10, 2011. The single also contains a cover of Fountains of Wayne's "Stacy's Mom" (which has always been a common misconception that it was originally by Bowling for Soup) and a re-recording of "The Bitch Song" off Bowling for Soup's 2000 album Let's Do It for Johnny!

"Stacy's Mom" cover

The Fountains of Wayne song "Stacy's Mom" was frequently misattributed to Bowling For Soup on YouTube and other video sites in the years following its release. Jaret Reddick has said that he regularly encountered fans at concerts who mistakenly thought "Stacy's Mom" was a Bowling for Soup song. Jaret said that by finally releasing their own version of the song, "I’ve basically just taken care of a large part of the population that’s been wrong for years, and I’ve made them right."

Track listing

References

Bowling for Soup songs
2011 songs